Rüdəkənar (also, Rudəkənar and Rudakenar) is a village and municipality in the Masally Rayon of Azerbaijan.  It has a population of 942.

References 

Populated places in Masally District